Little Hell is an unincorporated community  in Kent County, Delaware, United States.

History
While Little Heaven was built for the Irish workers of Jehu Reed, Little Hell was built for the African-American workers at the fruit plantation of Jonathan Willis. The two plantations shared the same meadow, separated by a brook, a branch of Murderkill Neck, that was nicknamed "The River Styx" in reference to Styx from Greek mythology. Newspaper reports said the area got its name when a group of 19th Century excursionists were attacked while traveling along the road from Dover to Bowers Beach.

References

Unincorporated communities in Kent County, Delaware
Unincorporated communities in Delaware